The Little Apocalypse is a 1993 French comedy film, an adaptation of Tadeusz Konwicki's novel, directed by Costa-Gavras. It was entered into the 43rd Berlin International Film Festival. It follows the trials of a Pole who lives in France who wants his written work published. Unable to get anywhere, he starts to enlist help from others, resorting to some unusual extremes.

Cast
 André Dussollier as Jacques
 Pierre Arditi as Henri
 Jirí Menzel as Stan
 Anna Romantowska as Barbara
 Maurice Bénichou as Arnold
 Henryk Bista as Yanek
 Enzo Scotto Lavina as Luigi
 Jan Tadeusz Stanislawski as Pitchik
 Beata Tyszkiewicz as Madame Pitchik
 Thibault de Montalembert as Arnold's assistant
 Chiara Caselli as Luigi's Daughter
 Jacques Denis as Doctor
 Olga Grumberg as Doctor's assistand
 Carlo Brandt as The kine

References

External links

1993 films
1993 comedy films
French comedy films
1990s French-language films
Films directed by Costa Gavras
Films scored by Philippe Sarde
1990s French films